Breitenhain is a village and a former municipality in the district Saale-Orla-Kreis, in Thuringia, Germany. Since 1 December 2010, it is part of the town Neustadt an der Orla.

References

Former municipalities in Thuringia